Sanlúcar la Mayor is a municipality in the province of Seville, southern Spain. The municipality is the location of the Solucar Complex.

Gaspar de Guzmán, Count of Olivares was created Duke of Sanlúcar la Mayor by Philip IV. He wished to retain his inherited title and so became known as el conde-duque.

References

Municipalities of the Province of Seville